In mathematics, a system of differential equations is a finite set of differential equations. Such a system can be either linear or non-linear. Also, such a system can be either a system of ordinary differential equations or a system of partial differential equations.

Linear system of differential equations 

Like any system of equations, a system of linear differential equations is said to be overdetermined if there are more equations than the unknowns.

For an overdetermined system to have a solution, it needs to satisfy the compatibility conditions. For example, consider the system:

Then the necessary conditions for the system to have a solution are:

See also: Cauchy problem and Ehrenpreis's fundamental principle.

Non-linear system of differential equations 

Perhaps the most famous example of a non-linear system of differential equations is the Navier–Stokes equations. Unlike the linear case, the existence of a solution of a non-linear system is a difficult problem (cf. Navier–Stokes existence and smoothness.)

See also: h-principle.

Differential system 

A differential system is a means of studying a system of partial differential equations using geometric ideas such as differential forms and vector fields.

For example, the compatibility conditions of an overdetermined system of differential equations can be succinctly stated in terms of differential forms (i.e., a form to be exact, it needs to be closed). See integrability conditions for differential systems for more.

See also: :Category:differential systems.

Notes

See also 
Integral geometry
Cartan–Kuranishi prolongation theorem

References 
L. Ehrenpreis, The Universality of the Radon Transform, Oxford Univ. Press, 2003.
Gromov, M. (1986), Partial differential relations, Springer, 
M. Kuranishi, "Lectures on involutive systems of partial differential equations" , Publ. Soc. Mat. São Paulo (1967)
Pierre Schapira, Microdifferential systems in the complex domain, Grundlehren der Math- ematischen Wissenschaften, vol. 269, Springer-Verlag, 1985.

Further reading 
https://mathoverflow.net/questions/273235/a-very-basic-question-about-projections-in-formal-pde-theory
https://www.encyclopediaofmath.org/index.php/Involutional_system
https://www.encyclopediaofmath.org/index.php/Complete_system
https://www.encyclopediaofmath.org/index.php/Partial_differential_equations_on_a_manifold

Differential equations
Differential systems
Multivariable calculus